Comair may refer to:

Comair (South Africa), defunct South Africa based airline
Comair Flight Services, South African business charter airline
Comair (United States), defunct Cincinnati-based airline owned by Delta Air Lines